Naanum Indha Ooruthan is a 1990 Indian Tamil-language film, directed by Shegar Raja and produced by Florida Fernando. The film stars Murali, Khushbu, Ravichandran and Nagaraja Cholan.

Cast

Murali
Khushbu
Ravichandran
Nagaraja Cholan
Sulakshana
Rajeev in Friendly Appearance
V. Gopalakrishnan
Samikannu
Chinni Jayanth
Pasi Narayanan
Trichy Murugan
Sabaskar
Master Vijay
Sabaana
Y. Vijaya
Mohanapriya
Jayanthi
Periya Karuppu Thevar
Sithan
Joseph Raja
Azhagu Nambi
Naadaar
Lakshmi

Soundtrack 
The music was composed by Shankar–Ganesh.

References

External links
 

1990 films
1990s Tamil-language films
Films scored by Shankar–Ganesh